Model Wife may refer to:

 Model Wife (web series), a web series by Corey Cavin, Josh Lay, and Bill Grandberg
 Model Wife (film), a 1941 American comedy film